Twilight as Played by The Twilight Singers is the first album by The Twilight Singers, released by Columbia Records in 2000.

Critical reception
The Washington Post wrote that "the hushed, claustrophobic approach to soul music recalls the spooky divorce albums by Marvin Gaye (1978's Here, My Dear) and Smokey Robinson (1984's Essar), even if [Greg] Dulli's melodies aren't quite as grabbing."

Track listing 
All tracks composed by Greg Dulli; except where indicated
"The Twilite Kid" - 5:52
"That's Just How That Bird Sings" (Greg Dulli, Harold Chichester) - 3:52
"Clyde" (Greg Dulli, Harold Chichester, Shawn Smith) - 4:40
"King Only" - 3:07
"Love" - 3:21
"Annie Mae" (Greg Dulli, Steve Cobby, David McSherry) - 2:20
"Verti-Marte" - 5:09
"Last Temptation" (Greg Dulli, Steve Cobby, David McSherry) - 3:26
"Railroad Lullaby" - 3:13
"East 17th" - 1:01
"Into The Street" (Greg Dulli. Harold Chichester) - 4:55
"Twilight" - 5:57

References

2000 debut albums
The Twilight Singers albums
Albums produced by Greg Dulli
Columbia Records albums